Hans Naderer (10 January 1891 – 28 June 1971) was an Austrian writer. His work was part of the literature event in the art competition at the 1936 Summer Olympics.

References

1891 births
1971 deaths
20th-century Austrian male writers
Olympic competitors in art competitions